Alistair Forrester (30 August 1950 – 26 May 2018) was a Scottish professional darts player who competed in the 1980s.

Career 
Forrester qualified twice to play in the World Professional Darts Championship but lost on both occasions. He was beaten 0–2 by Bobby George in the 1981 Championship and 1–2 by the Belgian Luc Marreel in the 1982 Championship. Forrester also lost in the first round at the 1981 British Professional, losing 0–3 to Alan Evans, and in the 1989 Winmau World Masters to Per Skau.

World Championship results

BDO
 1981: Last 32: (lost to Bobby George 0–2) (sets)
 1982: Last 32: (lost to Luc Marreel 1–2) (sets)

External links
Profile and stats on Darts Database

Living people
Scottish darts players
British Darts Organisation players
1950 births